Oreophryne jeffersoniana is a species of frog in the family Microhylidae.
It is endemic to Indonesia.
Its natural habitats are subtropical or tropical dry forests and subtropical or tropical dry shrubland.
It is threatened by habitat loss.

References

jeffersoniana
Amphibians of Indonesia
Taxonomy articles created by Polbot
Amphibians described in 1928